Cummings is an unincorporated community in Mendocino County, California.

The Cummings post office opened in 1888, closed in 1899, and re-opened in 1900. The name honors Jonathan Cummings, an early settler.

References

Unincorporated communities in California
Unincorporated communities in Mendocino County, California